Poplar River First Nation (Ojibwe: Azaadiwi-ziibing) is an Ojibwa First Nation in Manitoba, Canada. It is named after the Poplar River, which is the main river on which it resides.

Its landbase is the Poplar River 16, an Indian reserve located approximately on the east side of Lake Winnipeg at the mouth of the Poplar River.

The Southeast Resource Development Council is the Tribal Council affiliated with this First Nation. Poplar River is part of Treaty 5 Adhesion, signed on 20 September 1875.

Demographics 
As of 2013, the total population of registered First Nation peoples was 1,543, with 1245 on-reserve, and 298 off-reserve. The primary language spoken is Ojibwe, with some blending of the Cree dialect also known as Oji-Cree. The majority of surnames are Bruce, Franklin, and Berens.

There is an additional population consisting of Métis and non-status First Nations residing in the community, previously having a neighbouring Métis settlement, but it was abandoned.

The community has no municipality, district, or any other town associated or connected with it.

The people of Poplar River are viewed as a "proud" people. The people are non-prejudiced towards those of different backgrounds. Younger people will often affectionately refer to Poplar River as "Poplar River #16" or simply "#16" due to the treaty adhesion number. This has been the case for many decades.

The two main religions practiced in Poplar River are Roman Catholic and Pentecostal.

Community
The town itself is embedded along the main Poplar River with the primary township located on an atoll of land between Poplar River and Franklin River. The majority of the population resides along these two rivers, including three habitable islands located within the main Poplar River. Gravel highways exists throughout all of the community and bridges cross both rivers to connect all areas of the community. There are no paved concrete or asphalt roads or sidewalks.

Even though most people today use automobiles and walking power to travel the gravel paved roads, the use of watercraft and winter snowmobiles still remains.

Called Asatiwisipe Aki by the First Nation, their traditional land has been designated as a protected area with the support of the Manitoba government. It is one of the last remaining pristine river areas in the world, particularly in southern Canada. The river is very clean, with little or no man-made pollutants in the watershed. The Poplar River area may soon be designated as a section of a United Nations Heritage Site.

Amenities and businesses 
Northern, or The North West Company, is the largest business selling general merchandise ranging from household goods, food, petroleum products, electronics, clothing and more. Its predecessor was Hudson's Bay Company. The costs of goods in this community are higher than the Canadian average due to having to ship products via airplane, barge (during the summer months) or truck (during the winter months) from the main distribution outlets in Selkirk or Winnipeg, which are hundreds of kilometres south.
Mitasosipe Trading Post is the second largest store selling general merchandise.
Negginan Harbour Authority Inc. is the main small craft docking station which is officially governed by Fisheries and Oceans Canada.
Poplar River Elder's Lodge is a care facility for Poplar River's elderly population.
During the winter months, Poplar River is accessible via winter road. It is accessible year round via airplane, and via barge or water vessels during the summer months.
The majority of residents have modern conveniences of running water, plumbing and trash removal.
This community does not recycle.
Children attend Poplar River Elementary School from grade 1 to 9. This school features a modern gymnasium, library and standard education programs. Members who pursue education beyond grade 9 must attend high schools, universities or colleges off reserve.
Most members of this community have broadband internet access. In addition, many households own satellite receivers for their television entertainment needs.
Youth of this community are influenced by national and international pop culture including music, movies and fashion trends from around the world due to satellite television and the internet.

Environment 

The water, land, forest and beaches continue to remain free of pollution and industrial activity.

The land is unfit for farming, so therefore self-sufficiency based on agriculture is not an option. Due to its geographic location during the Pleistocene period, or last ice age, this land was located under a large glacier that ploughed away the topsoils that are necessary for agriculture. Around 10 centimetres of soil exists covering clay sediment. This is evident during the warmer summer months when clay mud is prominent throughout most of the foot-travelled areas of the community.

This community is in the Boreal Forest range of Canada, is not within the region of permafrost, and is geographically closer to the North Pole to allow for what is locally referred to as the Northern Lights, or the more scientific term Aurora Borealis.

Health
The general overall state of health for the community is lower than the national average. Due to genetic predispositions that are known to influence the metabolism of aboriginals, the lack of education regarding proper nutrition and the importance of exercise, obesity and diabetes and all related illnesses are still a health threat to a portion of the population. Heart attacks are appearing to be more and more common-place for adults at the age of 50 years. This can be attributed to the lack of healthier choices in foods that are brought in to the community.

The extremely high rate of unemployment continues to be a problem, but this is the same for all First Nation communities. This is due to the lack of businesses or new enterprises that would normally provide employment for the people. A large portion of the population collects social assistance in order to survive, and this has been an unavoidable fact of life for many generations of families.

The community has one of the lowest suicide rates compared to other First Nation communities.

Serious criminal activity is nearly non-existent, but drug trafficking, acts of violence and spousal abuse are common-place.

Alcoholism and drug addiction
Poplar River is a "dry" reserve, but prohibition laws are only enforced when citizens are acting irresponsibly or are a threat to others. Alcoholism occurs more prominently in certain families. There are no official studies to track alcoholism and its effects on the people.

Although alcohol can be smuggled in or obtained from bootleggers, the ease of drug smuggling is causing a dramatic increase in drug abuse causing serious addictions. The common drugs being used are marijuana, narcotic medication, cocaine and other illicit street drugs.

Post-European contact
Historically, cross-cultural influence by early European settlers and their governments are believed to have been the source of many problems for aboriginal peoples. The attempted assimilation of aboriginals is a well-known failure, and the loss of the traditional culture and religious beliefs has created a strong sense of hostility, loss and hopelessness within many aboriginal communities.

More importantly, in more recent decades the sudden change to mainstream diet could also have negative side-effects, not just with members of this community, but for all First Nation people; on or off reserve. The introduction of additives to foods such as hormones, antibiotics, tranquilizers, excessively high sugar, salt, and other additives, and even caffeine, nicotine and alcohol, could cause chemical changes in the bodies of First Nation people interfering with mental wellness . None of these substances except nicotine existed in their lives for thousands of years. Studies have shown that chemical imbalances could lead to irrational thoughts and behaviours triggering lengthy episodes of depression, anxiety, hostility and dependence on alcohol or mood-altering prescription medication or illegal drugs . This would explain the high incidents of alcoholism, higher than average rates of suicide, as well as other social ills. A sedentary lifestyle devoid of physical exercise is also known to trigger lengthy negative emotional events. There have been no in-depth scientific studies or analysis into this particular area specifically targeted at the First Nation peoples.

It has been recently discovered that the return to traditional spiritual, cultural, familial and dietary lifestyles could provide a more healthy way of life for aboriginal communities. While fishing and hunting has been practised by the elders, this knowledge is being taught and passed on to future generations. The preservation of the Ojibwa dialect is also paramount, and the return to traditional spiritual healing ceremonies and medicines may also remedy the mental, physical and emotional ills that are of great concern to the community. These teachings are ongoing.

The people in this community still persevere to overcome adversity today.

History of chiefs and councillors

References

External links 
Aboriginal Peoples Television Network
Assembly of First Nations
Famous Native Americans
Weshki-ayaad's Introduction to Ojibwe Language and Culture
First Perspective - Aboriginal News
Manitoba Aboriginal and Northern Affairs
NCI FM - Native Communications Inc.
Poplar River First Nation
Southeast Community Futures Development Corporation
The Weather Network - Poplar River First Nation Weather
Map of Poplar River 16 at Statcan

Southeast Resource Development Council
Ojibwe governments
Hudson's Bay Company trading posts
First Nations in Northern Region, Manitoba
Indian reserves in Northern Region, Manitoba
First Nations governments in Manitoba